Utoni Daniel Nujoma (born 8 September 1952) is a Namibian politician who serves as Minister of Labour, Industrial Relations and Employment Creation since March 2020. He has served in various government ministerial positions in the government since 2010.

Nujoma is also a member of both the central committee and the politburo of SWAPO. He is the first born son of Namibia's founding President Sam Nujoma, who was in office as president from 1990 to 2005, and Kovambo Nujoma, the former First Lady of Namibia.

Education and early life
Nujoma was born in Windhoeks Old Location (now Hochland Park) and raised by his mother Kovambo, as his father, SWAPO leader Sam Nujoma left for exile when Utoni was eight years old. He attended Rhenish Missionary School in Windhoek and later the Augustineum but was expelled in 1972 due to his political activity. In May 1974, Nujoma and his two brothers John and Sacky left to join their father in exile in Angola.

In 1974, Nujoma was sent to the Soviet Union to receive training in guerrilla warfare. After his return to Zambia he was stationed at the People's Liberation Army of Namibias military base of Shaatotwa. After Angola became independent in 1975, he was transferred there. In 1986, Nujoma was sent to Cuba for studies in political science; he returned home to South-West Africa in 1988. After the independence of Namibia, he graduated with an LLB degree from University of Warwick in England, United Kingdom (1990) and with an LL.M. degree from Lund University in Sweden (1996).

Political career
Nujoma served as deputy permanent secretary in the Ministry of Justice between 1992 and 1997. He was first elected to the central committee of SWAPO at the party's August 2002 congress, receiving 316 votes and placing 22nd out of the 57 members elected. He has served as a member of the National Assembly of Namibia and became Deputy Minister of Justice in 2004. He received the second highest number of votes in the election for members of the central committee at SWAPO's November 2007 congress.

Nujoma was promoted to Minister of Foreign Affairs in 2010. In the wake of the December 2012 SWAPO congress and the subsequent cabinet reshuffle, Nujoma became Minister of Justice, succeeding Pendukeni Iivula-Ithana. Nujoma was appointed as Minister of Land Reform by president Hage Geingob in March 2015. In 2020, he was appointed to lead the Minister of Labour, Industrial Relations and Employment Creation.

References

Living people
1952 births
Politicians from Windhoek
Ovambo people
Foreign ministers of Namibia
Justice ministers of Namibia
Labour ministers of Namibia
Land reform ministers of Namibia
Members of the National Assembly (Namibia)
Namibian Lutherans
Alumni of the University of Warwick
Lund University alumni
Augustineum Secondary School alumni
People's Liberation Army of Namibia personnel
SWAPO politicians
Children of national leaders